Jamie Campbell (born 21 October 1972) is an English former professional footballer who made over 300 appearances in the Football League. A defender or midfielder, Campbell played for Luton Town in the old first division, Mansfield Town, Cambridge United winning promotion to league 1, Barnet, Brighton & Hove Albion again winning promotion to league 1 and Exeter City, where he was Player of the Year in 2000–01. He then moved into non-league football with clubs including Stevenage Borough, for whom he played on the losing side in the 2002 FA Trophy Final, Woking, and Havant & Waterlooville.

References

1972 births
Footballers from Birmingham, West Midlands
Living people
Association football defenders
English footballers
Luton Town F.C. players
Mansfield Town F.C. players
Cambridge United F.C. players
Barnet F.C. players
Brighton & Hove Albion F.C. players
Exeter City F.C. players
Stevenage F.C. players
Woking F.C. players
Havant & Waterlooville F.C. players
English Football League players
National League (English football) players
Southern Football League players